Kane Street is a bus rapid transit station on the CTfastrak line, located near the intersection of Kane Street and New Park Avenue in Hartford, Connecticut. It opened with the line on March 28, 2015. The station consists of two side platforms serving the busway, with two lanes passing in the center to allow express buses to pass buses stopped at the station.

References

External links

Transportation in Hartford, Connecticut
CTfastrak
Transport infrastructure completed in 2015
2015 establishments in Connecticut
Buildings and structures in Hartford, Connecticut
Bus stations in Hartford County, Connecticut